Chathurangam may refer to:

Chathurangam, Malayalam film released in 1959 starring Prem Nazir and Sathyan
Chathurangam, Malayalam film released in 2002 starring Mohanlal and Navya Nair